Jimmy Weller III (born November 20, 1985) is an American professional stock car racing driver. He has driven in various levels of racing, including the NASCAR Xfinity Series and NASCAR Camping World Truck Series.

Racing career

Early years
Weller started his racing career in big-block modifieds near his family's steel business in Ohio. He returned to big-blocks in 2016 at Sharon Speedway and Lernerville Speedway after sponsorship issues in the NASCAR Xfinity Series.

Weller was critically injured in a 2004 sprint car accident at the Charlotte Motor Speedway dirt track. He was in the ICU for three weeks, two of them in a coma. His family credits the quick work of a local paramedic to save Weller's life after he flipped and got tangled in the catchfence.

K&N Pro Series East
Weller broke into the series in 2011, driving for family friend and NASCAR driver Dave Blaney. He finished 14th in his only race that year. In 2012, Weller ran the entire season with a family team. He scored two top ten finishes, including an eighth at Dover International Speedway. He ran a limited schedule in 2013 while also running some NASCAR Camping World Truck Series races. He recorded a best finish of eighth at Bristol Motor Speedway.

Camping World Truck Series
Weller debuted in the Camping World Truck Series in 2013 with SS-Green Light Racing, driving the No. 81 truck to a 24th-place finish at Iowa Speedway. He failed to qualify in SS-Green Light's No. 07 truck the next race at Eldora Speedway, and continued to struggle in occasional runs in the 07 until he returned to the 81 truck for the season finale, posting a career-best finish of 17th. Sticking with SS-Green Light in 2014, Weller made ten starts. He failed to finish half (two crashes, three mechanical problems), but recorded his first top-ten in the season's opening race. He also cracked the top fifteen later in the year at Charlotte Motor Speedway.

Xfinity Series
At the same time running a limited Truck slate, Weller attempted his first two NASCAR Xfinity Series races in 2014, starting and parking in one and failing to qualify for the other with SS-Green Light Racing. Splitting time between SS-Green Light (five races) and Rick Ware Racing (four races) in 2015, Weller failed to finish three of his starts and finished in the top 30 in five races. He performed well at Chicagoland, recording a career-best finish of 26th.

Motorsports career results

NASCAR
(key) (Bold – Pole position awarded by qualifying time. Italics – Pole position earned by points standings or practice time. * – Most laps led.)

Xfinity Series

Camping World Truck Series

K&N Pro Series East

 Season still in progress
 Ineligible for series points

References

External links
 

1985 births
Living people
Racing drivers from Ohio
NASCAR drivers
People from Hubbard, Ohio